Allan F. Bonnalie (1893–1981) was an early aeroplane builder and aviator in Colorado, multi-medal recipient of World War I in 3 branches of military and created a comprehensive crew training program for United Airlines Flight Training Center, Denver.

Bonnalie was inducted into the Colorado Aviation Hall of Fame in 1969.

Biography 
As a child, Bonnalie was so interested in aviation, about 1908, he built a glider patterned after the Wright Flyer plane model. The second plane was flown many times by himself and others. Bonnalie's first powered flight was in 1912 in a plane he designed and flew.
His biography was published on Amazon as "A Lifetime In Aviation" by Wayne Lundberg.

Military service
In 1917, he enlisted in the Aviation Section of the Army Signal Corps and attended the School of Military Aeronautics at the University of California. Prior to WWI, he had a total time in the air of not more than two hours in five or six different planes. In August 1917, he was sent to England, where he was attached to the Royal Flying Corp and participated in air raids against the enemy. Account of his heroism was included in the classic book "War Birds" by E.W. Springs.

In the military, he won the Distinguished Service Order, British, and the Distinguished Service Cross, USA. His ranks in the military: First Lieutenant in the Signal Corps, Lieutenant in the US Navy Reserve (USNR), a Lieutenant Commander in the Navy and Rear Admiral in the USNR in 1953. He was authorized to wear the wings of the Army, Navy, and Britain's RAF.

Commercial aviation
Bonnalie hired with United Airlines (UAL) from 1929 to 1958, Denver. He later became general manager of Lamsa Airlines, a UAL subsidiary in Mexico. He returned to Denver to manage the United Airlines Flight Training Center and developed a comprehensive crew training program using electronic flight simulators, both at Denver and Chicago, Il.

Hall of fame
Bonnalie was inducted into the Colorado Aviation Hall of Fame in 1969, the first Hall of Fame along with 9 other Colorado early aviators.

See also 
 Original ten 1969 Colorado Aviation Hall of Fame Laureates
 Ivy Baldwin
 Allan F. Bonnalie
 Ira Boyd "Bumps" Humphreys
 Albert E. Humphreys
 Will D. "Billy" Parker
 Chriss J. Peterson
 Reginald Sinclaire
 George W. Thompson
 Frank A. Van Dersarl
 Jerry Cox Vasconcells
 List of current Hall of Fame Laureates

References

External links
 Colorado Aviation Historical Society website
Further reading
 Holmes, Charles W., Editor, Honoree Album of the Colorado Aviation Hall of Fame, The Colorado Aviation Historical Society, 1999, Audubon Media Corp., Audubon, IA

American aviators
1893 births
1981 deaths